The Green Laurel (1963) is a novel for children by Australian author Eleanor Spence; it was illustrated by Geraldine Spence.  It won the Children's Book of the Year Award: Older Readers in 1964.

Story outline

The novel centres on a girl whose father runs a fair-ground train at a holiday resort.  Illness forces him to give up his job and the family move to a Sydney suburb close to a migrant camp.

Critical reception

Writing in The Canberra Times K. Masterman noted: "The interesting and fascinating story brings out well the character of the two contrasted environments, and without any suggestion of preaching establishes the sound values that are felt without needing to be expressed in this writer's work."

Awards

 1964 – winner Children's Book of the Year Award: Older Readers

See also

 1963 in literature

References

Australian children's novels
1963 Australian novels
Novels set in Sydney
CBCA Children's Book of the Year Award-winning works
1963 children's books